Douglas Kelley (1912 – 1958) was an American military intelligence officer who served as prison psychiatrist through the Nuremberg Trials. 

Douglas Kelley may also refer to:
Douglas Forsythe Kelley (born 1928), American industrial designer
Douglas Kelley, American novelist; his book The Captain's Wife fictionalizes the life of Mary Ann Brown Patten
Douglas Kelley, American journalist, contributor to Artnet
Doug Kelley, American lawyer, court-appointed receiver in the Petters Group Worldwide financial case

See also
Doug Kelly (disambiguation)